Charlottesville Area Transit (formerly Charlottesville Transit Service) is the provider of mass transportation in Charlottesville, Virginia. The organization was formed in 1975 when the city bought out Yellow Transit Company, which held a private monopoly on city busing. In 1999, the agency took a big leap in terms of providing better service and gaining more ridership, as it established a free shuttle route (which is officially called a trolley, using green-painted trolley-style buses) connected downtown with the University of Virginia. In 2007, the University Transit Service and Charlottesville Area Transit entered into an open ridership agreement that allows UVA students, faculty, and staff ride CAT for free by showing a valid UVA ID card. Eleven routes are offered Monday through Saturday from the early morning until the late evening. Sunday service is only available on the Free Trolley and Routes 2, 9, and 12.

Fares 
Due to the COVID-19 pandemic and funds provided by the American Rescue Plan & CARES Act, CAT operates fare-free. In December 2021, the City of Charlottesville announced that they received a grant from the Commonwealth Transportation Board to continue fare-free service through June 2026.

Routes

Fleet Information 
The fleet consists of the following vehicles (as of September 2018):

References

External links 
 Charlottesville Area Transit

Bus transportation in Virginia
Transportation in Charlottesville, Virginia
Transit agencies in Virginia